Mohan Gumatay (born October 19, 1977), known professionally as Mo  Twister, is a Filipino American radio and television presenter. He is best known for his Good Times programs, which started as a radio show and later spun off to the television and Internet. He currently resides in Las Vegas and remotely hosts the Good Times with Mo (GTWM) radio show on Magic 89.9 in the Philippines, as well as his own GTWM podcast.

Discography

TV shows
Celebrity Talk present (Main Host) (TV5)
Talk TV (ABS-CBN)
SOP (GMA Network)
ASAP (ABS-CBN) (1999–2003)
Cyberkada (ABS-CBN)
The Buzz (ABS-CBN)
Sabado Live (ABS-CBN)
Keep on Dancing (ABS-CBN)
Y Speak (Studio 23)
Showbiz Central (GMA Network) - co-host (2007–2010)
Points of View (Studio 23)
Kabarkada, Break the Bank (Studio 23)
Last Woman Standing (Q)
Good Times (Studio 23)
iMO: In My Opinion (ANC)
Paparazzi - co-host (TV5)
Juicy - co-host (TV5)
Willing Willie - co-host (TV5)
The G.O.A.T. - co-host (Fox Sports Asia)

Radio shows

Internet shows

Notes

External links

Official blog

1977 births
Living people
American people of Filipino descent
American people of Indian descent
American radio DJs
Filipino radio personalities
Filipino podcasters
Filipino people of Indian descent
Radio personalities from the Las Vegas Valley
Star Magic
ABS-CBN personalities
GMA Network personalities
TV5 (Philippine TV network) personalities